Julien Bill (born 2 May 1983) is a former Swiss professional motocross rider, world champion in MX3 class in 2011.

References

External links
 Julien Bill at The-Sports

Living people
1983 births
Swiss motocross riders
Sportspeople from Geneva